The Perlis State Mosque is a mosque in Arau, Perlis, Malaysia. It is the state and royal mosque of Perlis.

History
The mosque was built in 1972 on the site of the Old Arau Mosque used to stand. Arau Royal Mosque

Architecture
The mosque has a modern architecture style with Moorish influence. The floor is made of marble covered with carpet. It is capable of accommodating 7,000 worshipers. Its upper floor is dedicated for female prayer hall.

See also
 Islam in Malaysia
 List of mosques in Malaysia

References

1972 establishments in Malaysia
Arau
Mosques completed in 1972
Mosques in Perlis
Mosque buildings with domes